The history of minimum wage is about the attempts and measures governments have made to introduce a standard amount of periodic pay below which employers could not compensate their workers.

New Zealand
New Zealand enacted the first national minimum wage laws in 1894 by the Industrial Conciliation and Arbitration Act, which, unlike the wages board of Victoria, established arbitration boards to enforce compulsory arbitration.

Australia
In 1896, Victoria, Australia, amended the Factories and Shops Act to create a wages board. The wages board did not set a universal minimum wage; rather it set basic wages for six industries that were considered to pay low wages. First enacted as a four-year experiment, the wages board was renewed in 1900 and made permanent in 1904; by that time it covered 150 different industries.

By 1902, other Australian states, such as New South Wales and Western Australia, had also formed wages boards.

In 1907, the Harvester decision was handed down in Australia. It established a 'living wage' for a man, his wife, and three children to "live in frugal comfort".

On 14 December 2005, the Australian Fair Pay Commission was established under the Workplace Relations Amendment (WorkChoices) Act 2005. The responsibility of the commission includes the setting of the standard federal minimum wage, replacing the role of the Australian Industrial Relations Commission that took submissions from a variety of sources to determine appropriate minimum wages.

The Australian Fair Pay Commission was replaced by Fair Work Australia in 2010.

United Kingdom

The minimum wage was a major factor in British industrial relations from 1909 until the 1930s.

After a study of the minimum wage laws in Australia and New Zealand The Liberal Party acted to set up a minimum wage in the most heavily sweated or underpaid industries, as part of a broad range of social reforms. Winston Churchill, president of the Board of Trade, introduced the Trade Boards Act in 1909.  It created boards that set minimum wage criteria that were legally enforceable.  The main provision was to set minimum wages in certain trades with the history of low wages, because of surplus of available workers, the presence of women workers, or the lack of skills.  At first it applied to four industries: chain-making, ready-made dresses, paper-box making, and the machine-made lace and finishing trade.  About 70 per cent of their 200,000 workers were women.

Coal mining was added in 1912, after a major strike. In 1913, five additional wage boards were set up that covered hollow ware making, shirt making, sugar confectionery and food preserving, tin box making, and linen and cotton embroidery, along with a portion of the laundry industry. These extensions led to an additional 140,000 being covered by minimum wage legislation.  Unions pushed for the 1918 Act to greatly extend the coverage of minimum wages  In 1917, Whitley councils or Joint Industrial Councils were established in 41 industries with over 2 million employees to bring together unions and management to discuss not only wages and conditions but also a wide range of related issues such as jobs, security, benefits and technical education.

Starting in 1909, Liberals, led especially by Lloyd George, promoted the idea of a minimum wage for farm workers. Resistance of landowners was strong, but success was achieved by 1924.  According to Robin Gowers and Timothy J. Hatton, the impact In England and Wales was significant. They estimate that it raised wages for farm labourers by 15 per cent by 1929, and by more than 20 per cent in the 1930s. It reduced the employment of such labourers by 54,000 (6.5 per cent) in 1929 and 97,000 (13.3 per cent) in 1937. They argue, "The minimum wage lifted out of poverty many families of farm labourers who remained employed, but it significantly lowered the incomes of farmers, particularly during the 1930s."

By the 1920s, a new perspective was offered by reformers to emphasize the usefulness of family allowance targeted at low-income families was the best way to relieve poverty without distorting the labour market. The trade unions and the Labour Party adopted this view. In 1945, family allowances were introduced; minimum wages faded from view. Talk resumed in the 1970s, with an agricultural minimum wage remaining,   but in the 1980s the Thatcher administration made it clear it would not accept a national minimum wage. Finally, with the return of Labour, the  National Minimum Wage Act 1998 set a minimum of £3.60 per hour, with lower rates for younger workers. It largely affected workers in high turnover service industries such as fast food restaurants, and members of ethnic minorities.

United States
In 1912, the state of Massachusetts, United States, set minimum wages for women and children, and some states enacted similar protective laws. Under the Massachusetts laws, there was  "the power only to investigate conditions and recommend changes".

In the United States, statutory minimum wages were first introduced nationally in 1938 by president Franklin D. Roosevelt.

In addition to the federal minimum wage, nearly all states within the United States have their own minimum wage laws with the exception of Alabama, Louisiana, Mississippi, South Carolina, and Tennessee. Twenty-nine states have a minimum wage that is higher than the federal minimum wage.

Latin America
In the 1960s, minimum wage laws were introduced into Latin America as part of the Alliance for Progress; however these minimum wages were, and are, low.

European Union developments
In the European Union, 21 member states currently have national minimum wages. Many countries, such as Norway, Sweden, Finland, Denmark, Germany, Austria, Italy, and Cyprus have (or had) no minimum wage laws, but rely on employer groups and trade unions to set minimum earnings through collective bargaining.

In July 2014 Germany began  legislating to introduce a federally mandated minimum wage law, the Gesetz zur Regelung eines allgemeinen Mindestlohns (Mindestlohngesetz - MiLoG) (unofficial translation: "Act Regulating a General Minimum Wage (Minimum Wage Act)"),  which came into effect on 1 January 2015. The minimum wage is set at €8.50 per hour. A French law passed in the National Assembly on 17 February 2015 and effective from the end of 2015 imposed statutory minimum wage regulations on foreign truck drivers plying international routes to and from France and undertaking cabotage in the country.

The European Commission introduced an infringement procedure against France and Germany on 19 May 2015, arguing that the application of these laws in the transport sector had a disproportionately restrictive impact on the freedom to provide services and the free movement of goods, two of the principal freedoms on which the European Union is based. On 16 June 2016 the Commission sent a letter of formal notice to the French authorities on this subject and issued a supplementary letter to the German authorities, initiating two months' notice of potential legal action.

Switzerland
In May 2014, Switzerland was overwhelmingly defeated in a referendum concerning a proposal to set the minimum wage at 22 Swiss francs ($25), which would have given the country the world's highest minimum wage.

See also
 Barriers to entry 
 Labour law 
 Minimum wage
 Training wage

References

External links
Federal Minimum Wage. United States Department of Labor Wage and Hour Division. As of July 24, 2009.
History of the United States' Minimum Wage. Minimum-Wage.org. Retrieved May 17, 2011.

Minimum wage
Minimum wage
Australian labour law
United States labor law
Late modern economic history